The 2005 Fiji rugby union tour of Europe was a series of matches played in November 2005 in Europe by Fiji national rugby union team.

Results

Wales: 15.Lee Byrne, 14.Kevin Morgan, 13.Matthew Watkins, 12.Sonny Parker, 11.Shane Williams, 10.Nick Robinson, 9.Gareth Cooper, 8.8.Michael Owen (capt.), 7.Martyn Williams, 6.Dafydd Jones, 5.Luke Charteris, 4.Brent Cockbain, 3.Chris Horsman, 2.T.Rhys Thomas, 1.John Yapp,  – replacements: 17.Adam Jones, 18.Robert Sidoli, 20.Alix Popham, 21.Mike Phillips, 22.Ceri Sweeney     –  No entry : 16.Huw Bennett, 19.Robin Sowden-Taylor
Fiji: 15.Norman Ligairi, 14.Mosese Luveitasau Yabakitini, 13.Epeli Ruivadra, 12.Julian Vulakoro, 11.Sireli Bobo, 10.Seremaia Baikeinuku, 9.Moses Rauluni (capt), 8.Sisa Koyamaibole, 7.Aca Ratuva, 6.Alifereti Doviverata, 5.Isoa Domolailai, 4.Ifereimi Rawaqa, 3.Apisai Nagi Mavua, 2.Sunia Koto Vuli, 1.Josese Baleikasavu,  – replacements: 16.Bill Gadolo, 18.Kele Leawere, 19.Mosese Volavola, 20.Kini Salabogi, 22.Kameli Ratuvou     –  No entry: 17.Tiko Matawalu, 21.Aporosa Vata Tuinasau

Portugal: 15.Pedro Leal, 14.Antonio Aguilar, 13.Miguel Portela de Morais, 12.Diogo Mateus, 11.Frederico Sousa, 10.Duarte Pinto, 9.Jose Pinto Neves, 8.Vasco Uva, 7.João Uva (capt.), 6.Diego Coutinho, 5.Goncalo Uva, 4.Marcelo d'Orey Branco, 3.Joaquim Ferreira, 2.João Correia, 1.Rui Cordeiro,  – replacements: 16.Pedro Fonseca, 18.Arnaud Ferreira, 19.David Penalva, 20.Luis Pissarra, 21.Felipe Grenho, 22.Pedro Carvalho Cabral    –  No entry : 17.Rodrigo Aguiar
Fiji: 15.Jo Tora, 14.Neumi Nanuku, 13.Maleli Kunavore, 12.Kameli Ratuvou, 11.Sireli Bobo, 10.Jack Prasad, 9.Moses Rauluni (capt.), 8.Jone Qovu Nailiko, 7.Mo Volavola, 6.Kini Salabogi, 5.Kele Leawere, 4.Ifereimi Rawaqa, 3.Apisai Nagi Mavua, 2.Bill Gadolo, 1.Tiko Matawalu,  – replacements: 16.Sikeli Gavidi Tubuvanere, 17.Apisai Turukawa, 18.Akapusi Qera, 19.Sisa Koyamaibole, 21.Julian Vulakoro, 22.Epeli Ruivadra    –  No entry: 20.Saiasi Fuli

Italy: 15.Ezio Galon, 14.Samuele Pace, 13.Mirco Bergamasco, 12.Gonzalo Canale, 11.Ludovico Nitoglia, 10.Ramiro Pez, 9.Paul Griffen, 8.Sergio Parisse, 7.Mauro Bergamasco, 6.Alessandro Zanni, 5.Marco Bortolami (capt.), 4.Carlo Del Fava, 3.Martin Castrogiovanni, 2.Fabio Ongaro, 1.Matías Agüero,  – replacements: 17.Carlos Nieto, 18.Valerio Bernabò, 19.Maurizio Zaffiri, 20.Pablo Canavosio, 22.Rima Wakarua     –  No entry : 16.Carlo Festuccia, 21.Luciano Orquera
Fiji: 15.Norman Ligairi, 14.Mosese Luveitasau Yabakitini, 13.Epeli Ruivadra, 12.Seremaia Baikeinuku, 11.Kameli Ratuvou, 10.Nicky Little, 9.Moses Rauluni(capt), 8.Sisa Koyamaibole, 7.Aca Ratuva, 6.Alifereti Doviverata, 5.Kele Leawere, 4.Ifereimi Rawaqa, 3.Apisai Nagi Mavua, 2.Sunia Koto Vuli, 1.Josese Baleikasavu,  – replacements: 16.Sikeli Gavidi Tubuvanere, 17.Bill Gadolo, 18.Jone Qovu Nailiko, 19.Mosese Volavola, 20.Aporosa Vata Tuinasau, 21.Kini Salabogi, 22.Maleli Kunavore

References

 
 

2005 rugby union tours
2005
tour
2005–06 in Welsh rugby union
2005–06 in Italian rugby union
2005–06 in European rugby union
Rugby union tours of Wales
Rugby union tours of Italy
rugby union